Staunton is a surname. Notable people with the surname include:

 George Leonard Staunton, English botanist
 Sir George Thomas Staunton, English traveller and orientalist
 Henry Staunton (businessman), British businessman
 Henry de Staunton, English medieval professor of canon law and university chancellor
 Howard Staunton, English chess master who lends his name to a style of chess pieces
 Imelda Staunton, British actress
 Irene Staunton, Zimbabwean publisher and editor
 Madonna Staunton (1938–2019) Australian artist and poet
 Steve Staunton, former Irish footballer and former manager of Ireland national team
 Thomas Staunton (Nottinghamshire MP), MP for Nottinghamshire 1411
 Thomas Staunton (Ipswich MP), MP for Ipswich 1757–84

See also
 Stanton (surname)

English-language surnames